Jean Carpentier (26 September 1933 - 6 March 2018) was a French historian.

Jean Carpentier was an Honorary Inspector General of National Education.

Biography
He was married to Élisabeth Carpentier, also a historian, professor of medieval history at the University of Poitiers, who participated in the works edited by Jean Carpentier and François Lebrun. She has also written books on the battles of Poitiers and on Romanesque art with Marie-Thérèse Camus.

He was president of the Religions-secularism-citizenship Association (ARELC) created in January 1998, dissolved on 9 January 2010. This association wished to participate in the development, in a secular spirit and mainly in education, of knowledge of the religious fact and reflection on the concept of secularism.

Bibliography
 Histoire de France, éd. Seuil, 1987, with François Lebrun.
 Histoire de l'Europe, with François Lebrun, Seuil, 1992.
 Histoire de la Méditerranée, with François Lebrun, Seuil, 2001.

References

20th-century French historians
1933 births
2018 deaths
Academic staff of Rennes 2 University
People from Creil